I'd Rather Be Flag-Burning is a 1994 10" split between Propagandhi and I Spy on Recess Records. A CD version was also released in collaboration between G7 Welcoming Committee Records and A-Hole Records. The songs were rereleased in 1998 by G7 Welcoming Committee Records on two separate compilation albums: Propagandhi's Where Quantity Is Job #1 and I Spy's Perversity Is Spreading... It's About Time!.

Track listing
 Propagandhi - "The Overtly-Political-But-Oh-So-Intensely-Personal-Song" (a.k.a. "Mutual Friend") – 0:47
 Propagandhi - "...Little Ditty" – 0:32 (unlisted track)
 Propagandhi - "And We Thought Nation States Were a Bad Idea" – 2:28
 Propagandhi - "The Woe-Is-Me-I'm-So-Misunderstood-Song" (a.k.a. "Utter Crap Song") – 1:29
 Propagandhi - "Oka Everywhere" – 2:21
 Noam Chomsky - "On Violence" (a.k.a. "Chomsky Being Smart") – 0:35
 Propagandhi - "Haille Does Hebron" – 3:35
 I Spy - "Remain" – 1:30 
 I Spy - "Just Between Friends" – 2:06 
 I Spy - "No Exchange" – 1:27 
 I Spy - "T.I.Y. (Title It Yourself)" – 0:30 
 I Spy - "Digging a Grave". – 1:08 
 I Spy - "Because They Can't Speak for Themselves, Fucker" – 0:36 
 I Spy - "60 Billion Served" – 2:18 
 I Spy - "Appliances and Cars" – 4:00 
 I Spy - "Last Man on Earth" – 3:04

1995 EPs
Propagandhi albums